Vembakudi  is a village in the Aranthangirevenue block of Pudukkottai district, Tamil Nadu, India.

Demographics 

As per the 2001 census, Vembakudi had a total population of 1838 with 915 males and 923 females. Out of the total population 1429 people were literate.

References

Villages in Pudukkottai district
Pudukkottai district